Shakoy (Cebuano: syakoy; Tagalog: siyakoy;  Hokkien: 炸粿; Pe̍h-ōe-jī: tsia̍h-kué), also known as lubid-lubid ("little rope"), is a traditional Filipino deep-fried twisted doughnut. It is traditionally made with flour, sugar, salt, and yeast and deep-fried. It is then sprinkled with white sugar. Variants of shakoy can also be made with other kinds of flour, most notably with rice flour, which results in a chewier version that is also usually coated with sesame seeds. Dry and crunchy versions of shakoy, which are usually much smaller, are known as pilipit.

See also
Binangkal
Kumukunsi
Lokot-lokot
Panyalam
Untir-untir

References 

Doughnuts
Philippine snack food